Sahashi (written: 佐橋) is a Japanese surname. Notable people with the surname include:

, Japanese businessman
, Japanese government official
, Japanese composer

Japanese-language surnames